Autumn is the second EP by American alternative hip hop sextet Subtle. It was released in 2002 on the A Purple 100 label. 

The tracks "Arsenic Chic" and "Earthsick" also appear on Earthsick, a compilation of material from the group's Season EPs.

Track listing
 "Coldcoals Camera Action" – 2:40
 "Arsenic Chic" – 4:25
 "Bluerose Charade" – 2:25
 "6 Small Men in a Giant Robot" – 2:59
 "Earthsick" – 7:20

References

2002 EPs
Subtle (band) albums
Hip hop EPs